The following outline is provided as an overview of and topical guide to Canada:

Canada is a North American country consisting of ten provinces and three territories. Located in the northern part of the continent, it extends from the Atlantic Ocean in the east to the Pacific Ocean in the west and northward into the Arctic Ocean. It is the world's second largest country by total area, and shares land borders with the United States to the south and northwest, and marine borders with France and Greenland on the east and northeast, respectively.

The lands have been inhabited for millennia by various groups of aboriginal peoples.  Beginning in the late 15th century, British and French expeditions explored and later settled the Atlantic coast.  France ceded nearly all of its colonies in North America in 1763 after the Seven Years' War.
In 1867, with the union of three British North American colonies through Confederation, Canada was formed as a federal dominion of four provinces. This began an accretion of additional provinces and territories and a process of increasing autonomy from the United Kingdom, highlighted by the Statute of Westminster in 1931 and culminating in the Canada Act in 1982 which severed the vestiges of legal dependence on the British parliament.

Canada is a federation that is governed as a parliamentary democracy and a constitutional monarchy with King Charles III as its head of state. It is a bilingual and multicultural country, with both English and French as official languages at the federal level. Technologically advanced and industrialized, Canada maintains a diversified economy that is heavily reliant upon its abundant natural resources and upon trade—particularly with the United States, with which Canada has a long and complex relationship.

General reference

Pronunciation 
 Common English country name:  Canada
 Official English country name:  Canada
 Common endonym: Canada
 Official endonym: Canada
 Adjectival: Canadian, Canada
 Demonym: Canadian (Fr. canadien)
 Etymology: Name of Canada
 ISO country codes: CA, CAN, 124
 ISO region codes: See ISO 3166-2:CA
 Internet country code top-level domain: .ca
 International rankings of Canada

Geography 

Geography of Canada
 Canada is...
 a country
 a nation state
 a Commonwealth Realm
 a federation
 Location:
 Northern Hemisphere, Western Hemisphere
 Americas
 North America
 Northern America
 Time zones (Time in Canada):
 Newfoundland Standard Time (UTC-03:30), Newfoundland Daylight Time (UTC-02:30)
 Atlantic Standard Time (UTC-04), Atlantic Daylight Time (UTC-03)
 Eastern Standard Time (UTC-05), Eastern Daylight Time (UTC-04)
 Central Standard Time (UTC-06), Central Daylight Time (UTC-05)
 Mountain Standard Time (UTC-07), Mountain Daylight Time (UTC-06)
 Pacific Standard Time (UTC-08), Pacific Daylight Time (UTC-07)
 Extreme points of Canada
 North: Cape Columbia, Nunavut - (83°08' N, 74°13'W)
 South: Middle Island, Ontario - (41°41'N, 82°40'W)
 East: Cape Spear, Newfoundland - (47°31'N, 52°37'W)
 West: Yukon-Alaska border - (141°00'W)
 High: Mount Logan, Yukon 
 Low: North Atlantic Ocean, Arctic Ocean, and North Pacific Ocean 0 m
 Land boundaries:
 
  (on Hans Island)
 Coastline: 
 Population of Canada: 36,991,981 people (2021 Census) - 37th most populous country
 Area of Canada:  - 2nd most extensive country
 Atlas of Canada

Environment

Environment of Canada
 Climate of Canada
 Environmental issues in Canada
Fires in Canada
 Ecoregions in Canada
 Renewable energy in Canada
 Geology of Canada
 Earthquakes in Canada
 National parks of Canada
 Protected areas of Canada
 Wildlife of Canada
 Flora of Canada
 Fauna of Canada
 Birds of Canada
 Mammals of Canada

Geographic features 

 Canadian Arctic
 Fjords of Canada
 Glaciers of Canada
 Islands of Canada
 Lakes of Canada
 Great Lakes

 Mountain peaks of Canada
 The 100 Highest mountain peaks of Canada
 The 142 Most prominent mountain peaks of Canada
 The 100 Most isolated mountain peaks of Canada
 Appalachian Mountains
 Pacific Cordillera
 Rocky Mountains
 Volcanoes of Canada
 Prairies of Canada
 Rivers of Canada
 Waterfalls of Canada
 Valleys of Canada
 World Heritage Sites in Canada
 Other
 Canadian Shield
 St. Lawrence Lowlands
 List of National Historic Sites of Canada

Regions 

Northern Canada (The North)
Western Canada
Prairies
Eastern Canada
Central Canada
Atlantic Canada
Maritimes

Other regions
English Canada, sometimes known as the Rest of Canada (excluding Quebec) when considering topics of language
French Canada
Acadia
Quebec-Windsor Corridor

Ecoregions

Provinces and territories 

Provinces and territories of Canada

Provinces

Notes:

 Immediately prior to Confederation, Ontario and Quebec were part of the Province of Canada.
 Nova Scotia, New Brunswick, British Columbia, and Prince Edward Island were separate colonies at the time of joining Canada.
 Manitoba was established simultaneously with Northwest Territories.
 Saskatchewan and Alberta were created out of land that had been part of Northwest Territories.
 Prior to its entry in Confederation, Newfoundland had been a Dominion within the British Commonwealth, but due to a financial crisis during the Depression had surrendered its right to self-government and was under direct British governance.

Territories
There are currently three territories in Canada. Unlike the provinces, the territories of Canada have no inherent jurisdiction and only have those powers delegated to them by the federal government.

Note: Canada did not acquire any new land to create Yukon, Alberta, Saskatchewan, or Nunavut. All of these originally formed part of Northwest Territories.

Municipalities 

Municipalities of Canada
 Cities of Canada
 Capital of Canada: Ottawa

Demography 

Demography of Canada
 Canadians
 Immigration to Canada
 Aboriginal peoples in Canada

Demographics by political division

Provinces

 Demographics of Alberta
 Demographics of British Columbia
 Demographics of Vancouver (city)
 Demographics of Manitoba
 Demographics of New Brunswick
 Demographics of Newfoundland and Labrador
 Demographics of Nova Scotia

 Demographics of Ontario
 Demographics of Toronto (city)
 Demographics of Prince Edward Island
 Demographics of Quebec
 Demographic history of Quebec
 Demographics of Montreal (city)
 Demographics of Saskatchewan

Territories

 Demographics of Northwest Territories
 Demographics of Nunavut
 Demographics of the Yukon

Government and politics 

Politics of Canada
 Form of government: constitutional monarchy and democratic parliamentary federation
 Capital of Canada: Ottawa
 Provinces and territories of Canada
 Canadian and American politics compared
 Canadian and Australian politics compared
 Canadian Conservatism
 List of Canadian federal general elections
 Canadian Nationalism
 Elections in Canada
 Electoral ridings
 Electoral system
 List of elections
 Federalism in Canada
 Human rights in Canada
 Liberalism in Canada
 Political culture of Canada
 Political parties in Canada
 Political scandals of Canada
 Progressivism in Canada
 Socialism and Social Democracy in Canada
 Taxation in Canada

Branches of the government 

Government of Canada

Executive branch of the government 

 Head of state: Charles III, King of Canada
 Governor General of Canada, the King's representative: Mary Simon
 King's Privy Council for Canada
Prime Minister (Justin Trudeau)
Cabinet (Twenty-Eighth Ministry)
Ministries
President of the King's Privy Council
Privy Council Office
Clerk of the Privy Council
Government of Canada
 Head of government: Justin Trudeau, Prime Minister of Canada
 Cabinet of Canada (Majority government)

Legislative branch of the government 

 Parliament of Canada
 The King
 Senate of Canada
 Speaker of the Senate of Canada
 House of Commons of Canada
 Speaker of the House of Commons of Canada

Judicial branch of the government 

Court system of Canada

 Supreme Court of Canada
 Appellate Courts of the provinces and territories
 Alberta Court of Appeal
 British Columbia Court of Appeal
 Manitoba Court of Appeal
 New Brunswick Court of Appeal
 Court of Appeal of Newfoundland and Labrador
 Court of Appeal for the Northwest Territories
 Nova Scotia Court of Appeal
 Nunavut Court of Appeal
 Court of Appeal for Ontario
 Court of Appeal of Prince Edward Island
 Quebec Court of Appeal
 Saskatchewan Court of Appeal
 Court of Appeal of the Yukon Territory
 Superior-level trial courts of the provinces and territories
 Court of King's Bench of Alberta
 Supreme Court of British Columbia
 Court of King's Bench of Manitoba
 Court of King's Bench of New Brunswick
 Supreme Court of Newfoundland and Labrador 
 Supreme Court of the Northwest Territories
 Supreme Court of Nova Scotia
 Nunavut Court of Justice
 Ontario Superior Court of Justice
 Supreme Court of Prince Edward Island
 Quebec Superior Court
 Court of King's Bench for Saskatchewan
 Supreme Court of the Yukon Territory

Foreign relations 
Foreign relations of Canada

 Canadian Confederation
 Australia–Canada relations
 Canada–Caribbean relations
 Barbados–Canada relations
 Canada–Cuba relations
 Canada–Grenada relations
 Canada–Haiti relations
 Canada–Jamaica relations
 Canada–Croatia relations
 Canada–Cyprus relations
 Canada–Czech Republic relations
 Canada–Denmark relations
 Canada–Egypt relations
 Canada–Estonia relations
 Canada–Ethiopia relations
 Canada–Finland relations
 Canada–France relations
 Canada–Georgia relations
 Canada–Germany relations
 Canada–Greece relations
 Canada–Holy See relations
 Canada–Hungary relations
 Canada–Iceland relations
 Canada–India relations
 Canada–Indonesia relations
 Canada–Ireland relations

 Canada–Israel relations
 Canada–Italy relations
 Canada–Japan relations
 Canada–Kazakhstan relations
 Canada–Kenya relations
 Canada–Kosovo relations
 Canada-Latin America relations
 Brazilian–Canadian relations
 Canada–Chile relations
 Canada–Colombia relations
 Canada–Panama relations
 Canada–Paraguay relations
 Canada–Peru relations
 Canada–Uruguay relations
 Canada–Venezuela relations
 Canada–Mexico relations
 Canada–Latvia relations
 Canada–Lebanon relations
 Canada–Lithuania relations
 Canada–Luxembourg relations
 Canada–Malaysia relations
 Canada–Malta relations
 Canada–Mongolia relations
 Canada–Montenegro relations
 Canada–Morocco relations
 Canada–Netherlands relations

 Canada–New Zealand relations
 Canada–Nigeria relations
 Canada–Norway relations
 Canada–Pakistan relations
 Canada–People's Republic of China relations
 Canada–Philippines relations
 Canada–Poland relations
 Canada–Romania relations
 Canada–Russia relations
 Canada–Saudi Arabia relations
 Canada–Serbia relations
 Canada–Singapore relations
 Canada–Slovakia relations
 Canada–Slovenia relations
 Canada–South Korea relations
 Canada–Soviet Union relations
 Canada–Spain relations
 Canada–Sweden relations
 Canada–Switzerland relations
 Canada–Thailand relations
 Canada–Tunisia relations
 Canada–Turkey relations
 Canada–Ukraine relations
 Canada–United Kingdom relations
 Canada – United States relations
 Canada–Vietnam relations
 Canada–Zimbabwe relations

International organization membership
Canada is a member of:

African Development Bank Group (AfDB) (nonregional member)
African Union/United Nations Hybrid operation in Darfur (UNAMID)
Arctic Council
Asian Development Bank (ADB) (nonregional member)
Asia-Pacific Economic Cooperation (APEC)
Association of Caribbean States (ACS) (observer and partner)
Association of Southeast Asian Nations (ASEAN) (dialogue partner)
Association of Southeast Asian Nations Regional Forum (ARF)
Australia Group
Bank for International Settlements (BIS)
Caribbean Development Bank (CDB)
Caribbean Postal Union (CPU)
Commonwealth of Nations
Council of Europe (CE) (observer)
Euro-Atlantic Partnership Council (EAPC)
European Bank for Reconstruction and Development (EBRD)
European Space Agency (ESA) (cooperating state)
Food and Agriculture Organization (FAO)
Group of Seven (G7)
Group of Eight (G8)
Group of Ten (G10)
Group of Twenty Finance Ministers and Central Bank Governors (G20)
Inter-American Development Bank (IADB)
International Atomic Energy Agency (IAEA)
International Bank for Reconstruction and Development (IBRD)
International Chamber of Commerce (ICC)
International Civil Aviation Organization (ICAO)
International Criminal Court (ICCt)
International Criminal Police Organization (Interpol)
International Development Association (IDA)
International Energy Agency (IEA)
International Federation of Red Cross and Red Crescent Societies (IFRCS)
International Finance Corporation (IFC)
International Fund for Agricultural Development (IFAD)
International Hydrographic Organization (IHO)
International Labour Organization (ILO)
International Maritime Organization (IMO)
International Mobile Satellite Organization (IMSO)
International Monetary Fund (IMF)
International Olympic Committee (IOC)
International Organization for Migration (IOM)
International Organization for Standardization (ISO)
International Red Cross and Red Crescent Movement (ICRM)
International Telecommunication Union (ITU)

International Telecommunications Satellite Organization (ITSO)
International Trade Union Confederation (ITUC)
Inter-Parliamentary Union (IPU)
Multilateral Investment Guarantee Agency (MIGA)
Nonaligned Movement (NAM) (guest)
North American Free Trade Agreement (NAFTA)
North Atlantic Treaty Organization (NATO)
Nuclear Energy Agency (NEA)
Nuclear Suppliers Group (NSG)
Organisation internationale de la Francophonie (OIF)
Organisation for Economic Co-operation and Development (OECD)
Organization for Security and Cooperation in Europe (OSCE)
Organisation for the Prohibition of Chemical Weapons (OPCW)
Organization of American States (OAS)
Pacific Islands Forum (PIF) (observer)
Paris Club
ParlAmericas
Permanent Court of Arbitration (PCA) (partner)
Postal Union of the Americas, Spain and Portugal
Southeast European Cooperative Initiative (SECI)
United Nations (UN)
United Nations Conference on Trade and Development (UNCTAD)
United Nations Disengagement Observer Force (UNDOF)
United Nations Educational, Scientific, and Cultural Organization (UNESCO)
United Nations High Commissioner for Refugees (UNHCR)
United Nations Mission in the Sudan (UNMIS)
United Nations Organization Mission in the Democratic Republic of the Congo (MONUC)
United Nations Peacekeeping Force in Cyprus (UNFICYP)
United Nations Relief and Works Agency for Palestine Refugees in the Near East (UNRWA)
United Nations Stabilization Mission in Haiti (MINUSTAH)
United Nations Truce Supervision Organization (UNTSO)
Universal Postal Union (UPU)
World Confederation of Labour (WCL)
World Customs Organization (WCO)
World Federation of Trade Unions (WFTU)
World Health Organization (WHO)
World Intellectual Property Organization (WIPO)
World Meteorological Organization (WMO)
World Tourism Organization (UNWTO)
World Trade Organization (WTO)
Zangger Committee (ZC)

Legal system

Law of Canada
 Canadian Aboriginal law
 Canada Bank Act
 Canadian Bill of Rights
 Canadian competition law
 Constitution of Canada
 Canadian content
 Canadian contract law
 Canadian copyright law
 Canadian corporation
 Crime in Canada
 Canadian family law
 Criminal law of Canada
 Criminal Code
 Law enforcement in Canada
 List of law enforcement agencies in Canada

Military 

Military of Canada

 Command structure
 Commander-in-chief: Governor General of Canada (nominally, see also The Canadian Crown and the Canadian Forces)
 Prime Minister of Canada (de facto Commander-in-chief)
 Minister of National Defence
 Chief of the Defence Staff
 Royal Canadian Navy (RCN), command of the Navy;
 Canadian Army (CA) command of the Army;
 Royal Canadian Air Force (RCAF), command of the Air Force.
 Canadian Joint Operations Command (CJOC), responsible for all operations except special forces;
 Canadian Special Operations Forces Command (CANSOFCOM), responsible for special forces operations within Canada and abroad.
 Canadian Forces
 Army: Canadian Army
 Navy: Royal Canadian Navy
 Air force: Royal Canadian Air Force
 Special forces: Canadian Special Operations Forces Command
 Military reserve force: Canadian Forces reserve force
 Canadian Forces Primary Reserve
 Canadian Forces Supplementary Reserve
 Canadian Rangers
 Cadet Instructors Cadre
Canadian Coast Guard

Provincial governments

 Government of Alberta
 Government of British Columbia
 Government of Vancouver (city)
 Government of Manitoba
 Legislative Assembly of Manitoba
 Monarchy in Manitoba
 Government of New Brunswick
 Government of Newfoundland and Labrador
 Government of Nova Scotia

 Government of Ontario
 City of Toronto government (city)
 Government of Prince Edward Island
 Government of Quebec
 Government of Montreal (city)
 Government of Saskatchewan

Territory governments

 Government of the Northwest Territories
 Government of Nunavut
 Government of the Yukon

Politics by political division

Provinces

 Politics of Alberta
 Politics of Calgary (city)
 Politics of British Columbia
 Politics of Vancouver (city)
 Politics of Manitoba
 Politics of New Brunswick
 Politics of Newfoundland and Labrador
 Politics of Nova Scotia

 Politics of Ontario
 Politics of Ottawa
 Politics of Toronto (city)
 Politics of Prince Edward Island
 Politics of Quebec

 Politics of Saskatchewan

Territories

 Politics of Northwest Territories
 Politics of Nunavut
 Politics of the Yukon

History 

 Former Colonies and Territories in Canada
 Constitutional history of Canada
 History of immigration to Canada
 Economic history of Canada
 Fires in Canada
 Military history of Canada
 History of monarchy in Canada
 Persons of National Historic Significance
 Territorial evolution of Canada (1867–present)

History of Canada by period
Pre-Columbian era (Canada)
 1534–1763: New France
 1764-1867: Canada under British Imperial Control
 1867-1914: Post-Confederation Canada
 1914-1945: Canada in the World Wars and Interwar Years
 1945-1960
 1960-1981
 1982-1992
 1992–present

History of Canada by political division

Provinces

 History of Alberta
 History of British Columbia
 History of Vancouver (city)
 History of Manitoba
 History of New Brunswick
 History of Newfoundland and Labrador
 History of Nova Scotia

 History of Ontario
 History of Toronto (city)
 History of Prince Edward Island
 History of Quebec
 Demographic history of Quebec
 History of Montreal (city)
 History of Saskatchewan

Territories

 History of Nunavut
 History of the Northwest Territories
 History of the Yukon

Culture 

Culture of Canada
 Age and internet use in Canada
 Alcoholic beverages in Canada
 Architecture of Canada
 Gothic Revival architecture in Canada
 Oldest buildings in Canada
 Cuisine of Canada
 Supermarket Chains in Canada
 Decorations and medals of Canada (in order of precedence)
 Festivals in Canada
 Humour in Canada
 Languages of Canada
 Canadian Aboriginal syllabics
 Official bilingualism in Canada
 Canadian English
 Canadian French
 Media in Canada
 Symbols of Canada
 National symbols of Canada
 Coat of arms of Canada
 Flag of Canada
 National anthem of Canada
 Royal symbols of Canada
 Canadians
 Canadian identity
 Canadian nationalism
 Canadian cultural protectionism
 Ethnic groups in Canada
 History of immigration to Canada
 Prostitution in Canada
 Public holidays in Canada
 World Heritage Sites in Canada

Culture by political division

Provinces

 Culture of Alberta
 Culture of British Columbia
 Culture of Vancouver (city)
 Culture of Manitoba
 Culture of New Brunswick

 Culture of Nova Scotia
 Culture of Ontario
 Culture of Hamilton, Ontario (city)
 Culture of Toronto (city)
 Culture of Prince Edward Island
 Culture of Quebec
 Culture of Montreal (city)
 Culture of Saskatchewan

Territories

 Culture of Northwest Territories
 Culture of Nunavut
 Culture of the Yukon

Art in Canada
 Art in Canada
Canadian Artists
 Museums in Alberta
 Museums in British Columbia
 Museums in Manitoba
 Museums in New Brunswick
 Museums in Newfoundland and Labrador
 Museums in Ontario
 Museums in Quebec
 Museums in Saskatchewan
 Cinema of Canada
 Canadian Film Awards
 Canadian comics
 Central Canada Comic Con
 Literature of Canada
 Canadian writers
 Television in Canada
 Theatre of Canada
 Canadian playwrights

Music 

Music of Canada
 Canadian blues
 Canadian classical music
 Canadian hip hop
 Canadian Idol
 Canadian rock
 Caribbean music in Canada
 Music of Canadian cultures

Music by political division

Provinces

 Music of Alberta
 Music of British Columbia
 Music of Vancouver (city)
 Music of Manitoba
 Music of New Brunswick
 Music of Newfoundland and Labrador
 Music of Nova Scotia
 Music of Ontario
 Music of Toronto (city)
 Music of Prince Edward Island
 Music of Quebec
 Music of Montreal (city)
 Music of Saskatchewan

Territories

 Music of Northwest Territories
 Music of Nunavut
 Music of the Yukon

Religion in Canada 

 Religion in Canada
 Buddhism in Canada
 Christianity in Canada
 Roman Catholicism in Canada
 Hinduism in Canada
 Islam in Canada
 Judaism in Canada
 Sikhism in Canada
 Irreligion in Canada

Sport in Canada

Sport in Canada
Official Sports
 Ice hockey
 Lacrosse

Other sports
 Canadian football
 Canada at the Olympics
 Canada Rugby League
 Canadian Curling Association
 Canadian Figure Skating
 Association Football (Soccer) in Canada
 Cross Country Skiing
 Snowboarding in Canada

Hall of Fame Museums
 Hockey Hall of Fame
 Canadian Curling Hall of Fame
 Skate Canada Hall of Fame
 Canadian Lacrosse Hall of Fame

Economy and infrastructure 

Economy of Canada

 Economic rank, by nominal GDP (2007):  9th (ninth)
 Agriculture in Canada
 Banking in Canada
 Banks in Canada
 National Bank of Canada
 Communications in Canada
 Internet in Canada
 Companies of Canada
 List of convention and exhibition centres
 Currency of Canada: Dollar
ISO 4217: CAD
 Economic history of Canada
 Energy in Canada
 Geothermal power in Canada
 Health care in Canada
 Emergency medical services in Canada
 Mining in Canada
 Science and technology in Canada
 Stock exchanges:
 CNQ
 Nasdaq Canada
 Toronto Stock Exchange, S&P/TSX 60 is the main index of TSX
 TSX Venture Exchange
 Winnipeg Commodity Exchange
 Montreal Exchange
 Tourism in Canada
 Niagara Falls
 Transport in Canada
 Airports in Canada
 Rail transport in Canada
 Roads in Canada
 Water supply and sanitation in Canada

Economics by political division

Provinces
 Economy of Alberta
 Economy of British Columbia
 Economy of Vancouver (city)
 Economy of Manitoba
 Economy of New Brunswick
 Economy of Newfoundland and Labrador
 Economy of Nova Scotia
 Economy of Ontario
 Economy of Toronto (city)
 Economy of Prince Edward Island
 Economy of Quebec
 Demographic history of Quebec
 Economy of Montreal (city)
 Economy of Saskatchewan

Territories
 Economy of Northwest Territories
 Economy of Nunavut
 Economy of the Yukon

Education in Canada

Education by political division

Provinces

 Education in Alberta
 Education in British Columbia
 Education in Manitoba
 Education in New Brunswick
 Education in Newfoundland and Labrador

 Education in Nova Scotia
 Education in Ontario
 Education in Prince Edward Island
 Education in Quebec
 Education in Saskatchewan

Territories

 Education in Northwest Territories
 Education in Nunavut
 Education in the Yukon

Higher Education by political division

Provinces

 Higher education in Alberta
 Higher education in British Columbia
 Higher education in Manitoba
 Higher education in New Brunswick
 Higher education in Newfoundland and Labrador

 Higher education in Nova Scotia
 Higher education in Ontario
 Higher education in Prince Edward Island
 Higher education in Quebec
 Higher education in Saskatchewan

Territories

 Higher education in Northwest Territories
 Higher education in Nunavut
 Higher education in the Yukon

Bibliographies
Bibliography of Canada
Bibliography of Canadian history
Bibliography of Canadian military history
Bibliography of the 1837-1838 insurrections in Lower Canada
List of books about the War of 1812
Bibliography of Canadian provinces and territories
Bibliography of Alberta history
Bibliography of British Columbia
Bibliography of New Brunswick
Bibliography of Nova Scotia
Bibliography of Ontario
Bibliography of Saskatchewan history
List of books about prime ministers of Canada

See also

Canada

List of international rankings
Member state of the Commonwealth of Nations
Member state of the Group of Twenty Finance Ministers and Central Bank Governors
Member state of the North Atlantic Treaty Organization
Member state of the United Nations
Metrication in Canada

References

External links

Wikimedia Canada

 Government
 Official website of the Government of Canada
 Official website of the Prime Minister of Canada
 Official website of the Governor General of Canada
 Official website of the Canadian Forces
 Official Government of Canada online Atlas of Canada
 Canada and the United Nations

Crown corporations
 Canadian Broadcasting Corporation
 Canada Post
 Canadian Tourism Commission

Other
 Culture.ca — Canada's Cultural Gateway
 Culturescope.ca — Canadian Cultural Observatory
 Canadian Studies: A Guide to the Sources
 Statistics Canada with Canada's population clock
 The Canadian Atlas Online
 Canada. The World Factbook. Central Intelligence Agency.
 UN Human Development Program: Country Fact Sheet: Canada (link broken), Statistics — Country Sheet: Canada

Canada from The Canadian Encyclopedia

 
 
Canada